Edwin Arthur Schlossberg (born July 19, 1945) is an American designer, author, and artist. He specializes in designing interactive experiences, beginning in 1977 with the first hands-on learning environment in the U.S. for the Brooklyn Children's Museum. Schlossberg continues to work in the field and publishes often on the subject. He is the husband of Caroline Kennedy, daughter of John F. Kennedy and Jacqueline Kennedy Onassis. He has published eleven books, including Einstein and Beckett and Interactive Excellence: Defining and Developing New Standards for the Twenty-first Century. His artwork has been presented in many solo shows and museum exhibits. In 2011, he was appointed to the U.S. Commission of Fine Arts by President Barack Obama, serving until 2013.

Early life 
Schlossberg was born in New York City to an Orthodox Jewish family. Both his parents—Alfred I. Schlossberg and Mae Hirsch—were children of Ukrainian immigrants. Alfred founded a textile-manufacturing business and was president of the Park East Synagogue on New York's Upper East Side, where Ed studied Hebrew and celebrated his Bar Mitzvah.

Education 
Schlossberg attended New York's PS 166 and graduated from the Birch Wathen School and Columbia College of Columbia University in 1967. He was a classmate of New York City Schools Chancellor and United States Assistant Attorney General Joel Klein. He also received his masters and doctoral degrees from Columbia University Graduate School of Arts and Sciences.

Career 
Schlossberg's multi-disciplinary design firm, ESI Design, is based on Fifth Avenue in New York City.  It has produced award-winning interactive experiences for institutional and corporate clients.<ref name="nymag">Jeffery Hogrefe,  "The family man", New York, April 30, 2001.</ref> Signature projects include:

Terrell Place, Washington, D.C.
Barclays Center Media Experience, Brooklyn, NY
Best Buy – Concept Stores
Edward M. Kennedy Institute for the United States Senate
Ellis Island – American Family Immigration History Center
Playa Vista
Pope John Paul II Cultural Center
Reuters Spectacular at 3 Times Square
Sony Plaza and Sony Wonder Technology Lab
Time Warner Home to the Future installation
World Financial Center Breezeway Media Walls
World Trade Center and World Financial Center Informational Kiosks

Schlossberg has been singled out as a "leader in interactive design" by Wired'' magazine.

Schlossberg's plans for a redesign of the Rock and Roll Hall of Fame in Cleveland received public attention when ESI was engaged to lead the project in 2007, but the Hall of Fame ultimately chose a different design because of cost considerations.

Personal life
Schlossberg married attorney Caroline Kennedy on July 19, 1986, his 41st birthday. They have three children, all born in New York:

Rose Schlossberg (born June 25, 1988)
Tatiana Schlossberg (born May 5, 1990)
Jack Schlossberg (born January 19, 1993)

Bibliography

References

External links
ESI Design
330 Hudson

American designers
Bouvier family
Columbia College (New York) alumni
Jewish American writers
American people of Ukrainian-Jewish descent
Kennedy family
Living people
Writers from New York City
1945 births
New York (state) Democrats
Birch Wathen Lenox School alumni